Singularia alternaria is a moth of the family Pterophoridae. It is found in Argentina, Chile and Ecuador.

The wingspan is 13–21 mm. The head is scaled in pale grey and brown-grey scales. The antennae are pale grey to pale brown-grey. The thorax is pale brown-grey and the abdomen pale brown-grey, with three longitudinal brown lines on the upperside. The forewings are pale grey with indistinct pale brown-grey scaling with increasing intensity toward the base of the cleft. There are several dark brown spots and some dark brown and white scales. The fringes along the costal margin of the first lobe are alternating dark brown and pale grey. The dorsal fringes of the first lobe are grey-brown and the costal fringes of the second lobe have two alternating dark brown and grey-white patches. There are dark and light fringes along the dorsal margin in a pattern reversed to that of the costal margin. The hindwings are brown-grey on basal half, gradually turning more brown towards the termen. The fringes in all lobes near the base are grey, towards the termen they are brown. Adults have been recorded from October to February.

The larvae feed on Echium plantagineum, Echium vulgare and Malus sylvestris. They feed on the shoots and flowers.

References

Moths described in 1874
Pterophoridae of South America
Moths of South America
Fauna of Chile
Fauna of Ecuador
Pterophorini